Organic Letters is a biweekly peer-reviewed scientific journal covering research in organic chemistry. It was established in 1999 and is published by the American Chemical Society. In 2014, the journal moved to a hybrid open access publishing model. The founding editor-in-chief was Amos Smith. Since 2019, Erick M. Carreira serves as the editor-in-chief. The journal is abstracted and indexed in: the Science Citation Index Expanded, Scopus, Academic Search Premier, BIOSIS Previews, Chemical Abstracts Service, EMBASE, and MEDLINE.

References

External links

American Chemical Society academic journals
Biweekly journals
Organic chemistry journals
Publications established in 1999
English-language journals